Mark Kennedy (born May 5, 1952 in Greenville, Alabama) is an American jurist. He served as Associate Justice on the Alabama Supreme Court from 1989 to 1999. Previous to his service on the Supreme Court, Kennedy was appointed as judge of the District Court for Montgomery County in 1978, and was elected to that position in 1980. Concurrently, he was assigned as a full-time Family Court and Juvenile Court Judge for the 15th Judicial Circuit. In 1983, he was appointed as a circuit judge for the 15th Judicial Circuit, and was elected to that position in 1984.

He succeeded Joe Turnham as chair of the Alabama Democratic Party from 2011 to 2013, when he resigned. He was succeeded by his vice-chair Nancy Worley.

References

1952 births
Alabama Democrats
Living people
Alabama Democratic Party chairs